Joe Fortunato (born January 1, 1955) is a Canadian former professional ice hockey player.

Career 
Fortunato was selected by the New York Islanders in the third round (47th overall) of the 1975 NHL Amateur Draft, and was also drafted by the Cleveland Crusaders in the 8th round (104th overall) of the 1975 WHA Amateur Draft.

Fortunato played professional hockey for two seasons (1975–76 and 1976–77), recording 68 games in the minor leagues and one game in the World Hockey Association with the Edmonton Oilers, in 1976–77.

References

External links

1955 births
Living people
Canadian ice hockey left wingers
Cape Codders players
Cleveland Crusaders draft picks
Dayton Gems players
Edmonton Oilers (WHA) players
Erie Blades players
Ice hockey people from Toronto
Kitchener Rangers players
Maine Nordiques players
New York Islanders draft picks